Lou Marinoff is a Canadian-born academic, author, and Commonwealth Scholar. He is Professor of Philosophy and Asian Studies at The City College of New York and founding President of the American Philosophical Practitioners Association.

Education 
Marinoff studied theoretical physics at Concordia University and McGill University before earning a doctorate in philosophy of science at University College London. He then went to the Hebrew University of Jerusalem for post-doctoral work followed by a lectureship at the University of British Columbia.

Career 
In 1994, he joined The City College of New York where he currently serves as Professor of Philosophy and Asian Studies. He was also President and Executive Director of the American Society for Philosophy Counseling and Psychotherapy. He co-founded the American Philosophical Practitioners Association in 1998 and is the editor of its journal, Philosophical Practice.

Marinoff has also collaborated with institutes and forums such as the Aspen Institute, Biovision, Festival of Thinkers, Horasis, the Institute for Local Government at the University of Arizona, Soka Gakkai International, Strategic Foresight Group, and the World Economic Forum.

Table Hockey 
Marinoff is a three -time Canadian Open Table Hockey champion (1978, 79, 80) and US Open Champion (2015).

Films
2010: Changing Our Minds, Living Life Films, San Diego. Directed by David Sousa.

2006: Way of the Puck, Creative Ape Productions, Los Angeles. Directed by Eric Anderson.

2004: Table Hockey: The Movie, Triad Films, Nova Scotia. Produced by Peter d'Entrement, directed by Thor Henrikson.

Books
 The Middle Way: ABCs of Happiness in a World of Extremes. San Diego: Waterside Productions Inc., 2020 (first edition 2007)
  Therapy for the Sane: How Philosophy Can Change Your Life. San Diego: Waterside Productions Inc., 2020 (first edition 2003)
 Fair New World: A Savage Satire of Political Correctness and Radical Feminism (25th anniversary edition). San Diego: Waterside Productions Inc., 2019 (first edition 1994)
 On Human Conflict: The Philosophical Foundations of War and Peace. Lanham: Rowman & Littlefield, 2019
 Eloquent Sinking: A Gaspesian Tragicomedy. San Diego: Waterside Productions Inc., 2018
 The Power of Dao. Finding Serenity in Changing Times. San Diego: Waterside Productions Inc., 2017 (first edition 2014)
 The Inner Philosopher: Conversations on Philosophy's Transformative Power. A dialogue with Daisaku Ikeda. Cambridge, MA: Dialogue Pathways Press, 2012.
 Philosophical Practice. New York: Elsevier, 2001.
Plato Not Prozac: Applying Philosophy to Everyday Problems. New York: HarperCollins, 1999.

See also
 Philosophical practice
 Gerd B. Achenbach

References

External links
 
 American Philosophical Practitioners Association official website

Canadian philosophers
Living people
Alumni of University College London
City College of New York faculty
Philosophical counselors
Year of birth missing (living people)
Table hockey players